12 Years a Slave is a 2013 historical drama film directed and produced by Steve McQueen. It is an adaptation of the 1853 autobiographical slave narrative memoir of the same name by Solomon Northup, a New York-born free negro who was kidnapped in Washington, D.C. in 1841 and sold into slavery. The film stars Chiwetel Ejiofor as the protagonist, Northup. Michael Fassbender, Benedict Cumberbatch, Paul Dano, Paul Giamatti, Lupita Nyong'o, Sarah Paulson, Brad Pitt (also a producer of the film), and Alfre Woodard feature in supporting roles. The screenplay based on the aforementioned memoir was written by John Ridley.

Following successful screenings at the Telluride Film Festival and New York Film Festival, the film held its public premiere at the 2013 Toronto International Film Festival, where it won the People's Choice Award. Fox Searchlight Pictures initially gave the film a limited release at nineteen theaters on October 18, aimed primarily towards art house and African American patrons. The film was later given a wide release at over 1,100 theaters in the United States and Canada on November 8. 12 Years a Slave has grossed a worldwide total of over $187 million on a production budget of $20 million. As of 2019, it is McQueen's highest grossing film. Rotten Tomatoes, a review aggregator, surveyed 358 reviews and judged 95% to be positive.

12 Years a Slave garnered awards and nominations in a variety of categories with particular praise for its direction, screenplay and the acting of its cast. At the 86th Academy Awards, the film received nine nominations including Best Picture, Best Director for McQueen and went on to win three awards: Best Picture, Best Adapted Screenplay for Ridley, and Best Supporting Actress for Nyong'o. McQueen was the first black director to direct a Best Picture winning film as well as the first black producer to win Best Picture. The film earned seven nominations at the 71st Golden Globe Awards, winning for Best Motion Picture – Drama. At the 67th British Academy Film Awards, the film garnered ten nominations and went on to win two awards: Best Film and Best Actor for Ejiofor.

At the Producers Guild of America Awards, 12 Years a Slave, tied with Gravity for Best Theatrical Motion Picture. The film received four nominations at the 20th Screen Actors Guild Awards, with Nyong'o winning the award for Outstanding Performance by a Female Actor in a Supporting Role. McQueen was also nominated at the Directors Guild of America Awards. Both the American Film Institute and National Board of Review included the film in their list of top ten films of 2013.

Accolades

See also
 2013 in film

References

External links
 

Lists of accolades by film